Snapchat’s My Ex-BFF Court,” Is a 2018 spoof of daytime-TV fare like the typical court shows we watch for example “Divorce Court” in which two former friends try to come up with a solution for their issue. Who ever is guilty gets an hilarious sentence.

Background 
Vertical Networks (Snapchat Publisher Story) is using the actual set from the “Divorce Court” which is located at a studio in West L.A. Vertical Networks was founded in 2016, it is currently located in Southern California and is operated by CEO Jesús Chavez.

Format 
Every episode is hosted by Judge Matteo Lane (born as Matthew Lane), a comedian who brings justice to every case with sassiness.

Cast

Main 

 Matteo Lane as himself (Judge)

Guest Stars 

 George Todd McLachlan as himself
 Marco DelVecchio as himself
 Tyrone Emanuel as himself
 Anthony Rory Tran as himself
 Reante Brown as himself 
 VitoAngelino Kaiewe as Vito

References 

2018 American television series debuts
English-language television shows
2010s American reality television series